The South African Formula One Championship, was a Formula One motor racing championship held in South Africa between 1960 and 1975, including races in Rhodesia and Portuguese Mozambique.

The front-running cars in the series were recently retired from the world championship although there was also a healthy selection of locally built or modified machines, and from the late 60s Formula 5000 added to grids with Formula Two cars joining in 1973. Front-running drivers from the series usually contested their local World Championship Grand Prix, as well as occasional European events, although they had little success at that level.

1967 also saw a remarkable result by Rhodesian driver John Love with a 2.7 litre four-cylinder Cooper-Climax; Love was in his forties and, although seen as one of the finest drivers in Southern Africa, was not a major star. He led and finished second in that year's South African Grand Prix. Love's Cooper was originally designed for the short races of the Tasman Series, and to run a full Grand Prix, he added two auxiliary gas tanks. Unfortunately, the auxiliary tanks' fuel pump failure forced him to refuel after having led most of the race.

Love and Dave Charlton both won the South African Formula One championship for six consecutive seasons, Love from 1964 to 1969 and Charlton from 1970 to 1975. In 1975 Ian Scheckter raced the Tyrrell 007 that had been campaigned by brother, Jody, in the previous year's world championship and won five of the season's races, including four on the trot. However, he only had one other points finish, fifth place at the False Bay "100" on 5 July, giving him a points total of 47 for the season. Charlton proved more consistent with three victories and five second-place finishes to give him a points total of 57. By winning the Natal Spring Trophy at Roy Hesketh Circuit on 1 September, Charlton joined Rhodesian John Love as a six-time winner of the South African National Drivers Championship. Charlton ended the South African Formula One Championship by winning the final race of the season, the Rand Spring Trophy at Kyalami on 4 October after the faster Scheckter retired with a driveshaft problem.

Primarily owing to cost and dwindling grids, the Formula One championship was replaced at the end of the 1975 season with Formula Atlantic. The South Africans had tried to build interest by padding the field with Formula 2 and Formula 5000 cars, but viewership was in a steady decline, not helped by a somewhat Byzantine points system. 1976 would see the start of the domination of South Africa's National Championship by Ian Scheckter. Indeed, had it not been for youthful exuberance, Scheckter may have won the 1975 title. He won more races than Charlton, but Charlton was more consistent. Scheckter won the first four championships in a row for Lexington Racing before United Tobacco Company withdrew their teams (Lexington, Gunston and Texan). With Gunston returning in 1983, Scheckter returned to the Championship and won a further two championships to join Love and Charlton as a six-time winner.

South African National Drivers Champions

References

External links
Racing Years - South African F1 Championship Results
GEL Motorsport Information Page: The Formula One Archives
Quintin Cloud's Formula One Records
Project 009900 (German)

1960 establishments in South Africa
1975 disestablishments in South Africa
Formula racing series
Formula One
Auto racing series in South Africa
Motorsport in Rhodesia